Julien Hall (built 1825) was a building in Boston, Massachusetts, on the corner of Congress Street and Milk Street. It flourished 1825-1843, housing a variety of public events such as lectures by Red Jacket, William Lloyd Garrison; temperance meetings; political meetings; auctions; exhibitions of live animals, portraits by William James Hubard, John H. I. Browere; performances of the "automaton chess player" and the "panharmonicon;" and so on. By 1842 boxer John Sheridan had converted space in the hall into an athletic gymnasium.

The building was known as "Julien Hall" because it had been "built on the land where formerly stood the much noted Julien's Restorator." It was also called "Congress Hall." In 1828 it was described as "a large and convenient edifice ... erected in 1825, by Dr. Edward H. Robbins. ... There are two halls in this building, 55 by 44 feet square; the principal one is 15 feet high, and receives light through the cupola in the centre. These are rented for various purposes, such as public exhibitions, the holding of meetings, &c."

Events at the Hall

 1825
 "Hubard Gallery" of William James Hubard, silhouette portrait artist (1825-1826). Also on display was John H.I. Browere's portrait bust of Gilbert Stuart
 Panharmonicon
 Oct. - Auction of "Russia goods" by J.L. Cunningham
 Dec. 12 - City election, ward 8
 1826
 Automaton chess player, exhibited by Johann Nepomuk Maelzel
 Nov. 28 - Meeting of supporters of mayor Josiah Quincy
 1827
 March 31 - Temperance meeting
 Dec. 5 - Meeting of the Massachusetts Society for the Suppression of Intemperance
 1829
 April - "Red Jacket. The Indian chief whom Washington in 1792 pronounced 'the flower of the forest' has arrived in this city. ... On Tuesday next he intends to deliver a speech at Julien Hall, in his native tongue."
 1830
 April - Lectures by Robert L. Jennings, "a disciple of Owen, Wright & Co., of New York"
 August - Exhibition of live snakes: "the anaconda, the boa constrictor, and the strangling serpents"
 Oct. 15 - Lecture by William Lloyd Garrison
 Abner Kneeland's "First Society of Free Enquirers" (ca.1830-1834)
 "Robert Dale Owen, the platonic friend of Fanny Wright, is delivering a course of infidel lectures at the Julien Hall in Boston"

 1831
 Newtonian institute: "Courses of lectures will be given in English history, natural history of the animal kingdom, astronomy"
 1833
 July - "Wandering Piper"
 1835
 Jan. 21 - New-England Anti-Slavery Society 3rd annual meeting. "At the close of the meeting, the 'Colored Juvenile Choir, under the direction of Miss Paul,' sang "[s]everal hymns suited to the occasion" in the auditorium, which was 'crowded to suffocation.'"
 May 20 - Theophilus Fisk, "Capital against Labor: an address delivered at Julien Hall before the mechanics of Boston." "The history of the producers of wealth, of the industrious classes, is that of a continual warfare of honesty against fraud, weakness against power, justice against oppression...."
 July - Discussion "between the Rev. Mr. Gurley, agent of the Colonization Society and the Rev. Mr. May, an advocate for immediate emancipation"
 August - Anti-Catholic lecture by M'Calla
 Oct. -- "Abolition address" by George Thompson
 Massachusetts Anti-Slavery Society meetings
 1842
 John Sheridan's Gymnasium, 1842-1843

Images

References

Commercial buildings completed in 1825
Former buildings and structures in Boston
1825 establishments in Massachusetts
Financial District, Boston
19th century in Boston